Pablo Daniel de Muner (born 14 April 1981) is an Argentine football manager and former player who played as a right back. He is the current manager of Chilean club O'Higgins.

Football career
De Muner was born in Caseros, Buenos Aires. A product of the youth system at Argentinos Juniors, he rose through the ranks to become team captain in 2007.

De Muner was, however, released in July of the same year, and had almost everything agreed with La Liga club Racing de Santander before the deal eventually failed. The defender also settled in Spain, signing on 30 August with Polideportivo Ejido in the country's second division.

In 2008, as the Andalusia side was relegated – with the player only appearing in 15 matches out of 42 – de Muner returned to Argentina to play for newly promoted San Martín de Tucumán in the Primera División, meeting the same fate.

Coaching career
After retiring in 2017 at the age of 36, de Muner became a manager.

In the summer 2019, De Muner was hired as manager for Defensa y Justicia's reserve team. On 22 January 2020 the club announced, that first team manager Mariano Soso had left the club and De Muner would take charge of the team temporarily.

Personal life
De Muner's cousin, Leandro, was also a footballer.

References

External links
 Argentine League statistics  
 
 
 

1981 births
Living people
Sportspeople from Buenos Aires Province
Argentine people of Dutch descent
Argentine footballers
Association football defenders
Argentine Primera División players
Primera Nacional players
Argentinos Juniors footballers
San Martín de Tucumán footballers
Boca Unidos footballers
Deportivo Merlo footballers
Segunda División players
Polideportivo Ejido footballers
Chilean Primera División players
Unión San Felipe footballers
Bolivian Primera División players
Oriente Petrolero players
Paraguayan Primera División players
Club Sol de América footballers
Argentina under-20 international footballers
Argentine expatriate footballers
Expatriate footballers in Spain
Expatriate footballers in Chile
Expatriate footballers in Bolivia
Expatriate footballers in Paraguay
Argentine expatriate sportspeople in Spain
Argentine expatriate sportspeople in Chile
Argentine expatriate sportspeople in Bolivia
Argentine expatriate sportspeople in Paraguay
Argentine football managers
All Boys managers
Defensa y Justicia managers
San Martín de Tucumán managers
O'Higgins F.C. managers
Argentine expatriate football managers
Expatriate football managers in Chile